Hunkin is a surname. Notable people with the surname include:

Chris Hunkin (born 1980), English cricketer
Joseph Hunkin (Governor of Scilly) (1610-1661), Governor of Scilly during the English Civil War
Joseph Hunkin (Bishop of Truro) (1887-1950), eighth Anglican Bishop of Truro
Lauren Hunkin (born 1979), Canadian show jumper
Tim Hunkin, English engineer, cartoonist, writer, and artist

See also
 The surname Hunkins